Gary Siuzdak is an American chemist best known for his work in the field of metabolomics, activity metabolomics (a termed coined in 2019), and mass spectrometry. His lab discovered indole-3-propionic acid as a gut bacteria derived metabolite in 2009.  He is currently the Professor and Director of The Center for Metabolomics and Mass Spectrometry at Scripps Research in La Jolla, California. Siuzdak has also made contributions to virus analysis, viral structural dynamics, as well as developing mass spectrometry imaging technology using nanostructured surfaces. The Siuzdak lab is also responsible for creating the research tools XCMS, METLIN, METLIN Neutral Loss and Q-MRM. As of January 2021, the XCMS/METLIN platform has over 50,000 registered users.

Siuzdak studied chemistry (B.S.) and applied mathematics (B.A.) at Rhode Island College. He then went to Dartmouth College for his graduate work where he built his first mass spectrometer to perform multi-photon ionization mass spectrometry experiments and occasionally compete in powerlifting. At Dartmouth he received his Ph.D in Physical Chemistry (March 29, 1990) and on April 1, 1990 started at Scripps Research. In 2017 Siuzdak received an honorary doctorate (with Emmanuelle Charpentier) from Umeå University for his work in metabolomics. Siuzdak has hundreds of papers and has authored two books: Mass Spectrometry for Biotechnology (1996) and The Expanding Role of Mass Spectrometry in Biotechnology (2003) as well as The Expanding Role of Mass Spectrometry in Biotechnology 2nd Ed. (2006).

Notable research
From 1994 to the present the Siuzdak lab has been working on activity metabolomics. using liquid chromatography mass spectrometry-based metabolomics to identify metabolites that alter phenotype. His initial efforts with Richard Lerner, used liquid chromatography mass spectrometry to perform metabolomic experiments on the cerebral spinal fluid of sleep deprived animals. cis-9,10-octadecenoamide, a novel lipid hormone (also known as oleamide), was observed and shown to have sleep inducing properties. This work is one of the earliest such experiments combining liquid chromatography mass spectrometry and metabolomics to identify active metabolites. Another notable activity metabolomics effort with Oscar Yanes (Spain) identified neuroprotectin D1 as a metabolite that promotes stem cell differentiation.

In 1996 whole virus analysis was performed with an electrospray ionization mass spectrometer where the virus was collected and successfully tested for viability. Later, he and his collaborators provided the first example of a whole intact virus (tobacco mosaic virus) being mass measured using a charge detection mass spectrometer, an instrument designed by Henry Benner and Stephen Fuerstenau at Lawrence Berkeley National Labs.

In 1999, the Siuzdak lab described the use of nanostructures to enhance desorption/ionization on porous silicon of small molecules (DIOS), this is also known as the first surface-based example of surface-assisted laser desorption/ionization mass spectrometry (SALDI-MS). This technology went on to be expanded using fluorinated initiator molecules used within the porous silicon and was described as Nanostructure Initiator Mass Spectrometry (NIMS), it is also known as Nanostructure Imaging Mass Spectrometry (NIMS) because of its expanded application to imaging.

In 2005, the Siuzdak lab was engaged in identifying dysregulated metabolic peaks from liquid chromatography mass spectrometry data sets, to address the issue retention time alignment they developed the first algorithm that allowed for the nonlinear alignment of metabolomics data called XCMS.

From the early 2000s to the present, the Siuzdak lab created and has been expanding the tandem mass spectrometry database known as METLIN. METLIN is made up solely of experimental data generated from high resolution tandem mass spectrometry instrumentation, all of the data is derived from molecular standards. METLIN (as of August 2022) has over 870,000 molecular standards with experimental tandem mass spectrometry data. METLIN is unique with respect to its size, as other databases are over an order of magnitude smaller,  and it is also unique because all of METLIN's tandem mass spectrometry data has been systematically generated at multiple collision energies and in positive and negative ionization modes.

In 2020, the Siuzdak lab building off their work with Xavi Domingo and METLIN, developed Enhanced In-Source Fragmentation/Annotation (EISA) to facilitate the fragmentation, identification, and quantification (via Q-MRM) of molecules without the use of tandem mass spectrometry.

References

External links
 Siuzdak Lab at Scripps Research

Rhode Island College alumni
Dartmouth College alumni
Scripps Research faculty
Living people
20th-century American chemists
21st-century American chemists
1961 births